Marc De Clerck (born 27 December 1949) is a Belgian former footballer, who played as a goalkeeper for Ghent, FC Twente, Go Ahead Eagles, Aberdeen and SC Heracles.

De Clerck made his professional debut in season 1970/71 for Ghent. In the summer of 1974 he signed for FC Twente, but then moved to SC Heracles in 1976. After three seasons with SC Heracles, he moved to Go Ahead Eagles for the 1979–80 season.

In August 1980, De Clerck signed for Aberdeen in the Scottish Premier Division. In his debut for the club, a Scottish League Cup tie against Berwick Rangers, he scored a goal from a long clearance. He injured his ankle in his next game, a league match against Kilmarnock, and failed to regain his place in the side on regaining his fitness. After one year in Scotland De Clerck moved back to Heracles on a free transfer. He later played for De Graafschap and Belgian club KRC Harelbeke before retiring as a player.

De Clerck later managed KRC Gent-Zeehaven.

See also 

List of goalscoring goalkeepers

References 

 
 Ik was Heracles: Marc De Clerck, WijzijnHeracles.nl, 20 June 2008 
 

1949 births
Living people
Belgian footballers
Association football goalkeepers
K.A.A. Gent players
FC Twente players
Go Ahead Eagles players
Aberdeen F.C. players
Heracles Almelo players
De Graafschap players
Belgian expatriate footballers
Expatriate footballers in the Netherlands
Expatriate footballers in Scotland
Scottish Football League players
K.R.C. Zuid-West-Vlaanderen players
K.R.C. Gent managers